Dan Gîrleanu (born 2 June 1954)  is a retired Romanian volleyball player who won a bronze medal at the 1980 Summer Olympics. At the club level he played for Dinamo București, winning with them the 1979 CEV Cup, the 1981 CEV Champions League and seven national titles.

Gîrleanu graduated in physical education from West University of Timișoara, in law from University of Bucharest, and in political sciences from Saint Leo University in Florida, U.S. After retiring from competitions he worked as a coach for CS Electra București (1988–1992). He was appointed a federal coach (1992–1994), then the secretary-general of the Romanian Volleyball Federation between 1994–1996. From 1996 to 2000 he coached at Saint Leo University and in 2000–2008 lectured in social sciences and physical education at University of Tampa and University of Houston. Between 2008–2010 he was the technical director of the FIVB Regional Development Center in Barbados. Between 2011–2013 he returned to Romania to become head coach of the volleyball team at CS Universitatea Cluj-Napoca. In 2014–2015 he was a coordinator for volleyball development in Saint Kitts and Nevis, and in 2016 came back to Romania to work as a sports consultant for children and junior volleyball at CSM București.

References

External links 

 
 
 

1954 births
Living people
Romanian men's volleyball players
West University of Timișoara alumni
University of Bucharest alumni
Saint Leo University alumni
Romanian emigrants to the United States
Olympic volleyball players of Romania
Volleyball players at the 1980 Summer Olympics
Olympic bronze medalists for Romania
Olympic medalists in volleyball
Medalists at the 1980 Summer Olympics